Danique Kerkdijk (born 1 May 1996) is a Dutch professional footballer who plays as a defender for Eredivisie club Twente and the Netherlands national team.

Club career

Her career begins at the youth teams of amateur club SC Overwetering in Olst. During the 2009–10 season, she was part of a training group of under-14 age players, training at both SC Overwetering and FC Twente. A season later, she became a FC Twente youth player; by 2012 she reached the club first team (which plays in the BeNe League / Eredivisie). By 2013 she started playing matches regularly for the first team and in 2014 she signed her first professional contract with the club. Over the following years at the club she won many titles, played for them in 88 games and scored five times.
Following the end of the 2016–17 season for FC Twente, she signed for Bristol City, who play in the English FA WSL 1 league. At the announcement she said: "I was really impressed at the club's vision for the future, I believe this is the best place for me to grow and develop as a player." She made her debut for the team in the 6–0 defeat against reigning champions Chelsea L.F.C. in September 2017. Kerkdijk expressed the hope that the increased level of training at Bristol compared to Twente would result in continued call ups for the national team.

On 1 June 2019 Danique signed for WSL side Brighton & Hove Albion.

After five years in England she returned to the Netherlands to play for Twente again.

International career
Kerkdijk progressed through the Netherlands national team youth system, she won the 2014 UEFA Women's Under-19 Championship, before arriving at the senior team.

She debuted for the senior team on 17 September 2015, in an 8–0 friendly win over Belarus.

In April 2015, it was announced that Kerkdijk was one of seven FC Twente players named for the initial Dutch team for the 2015 FIFA Women's World Cup. She was cut from the squad when it was reduced from 35 to 23 players in the following month.

Honours

Club
FC Twente
 BeNe League (2): 2012–13, 2013–14
 Eredivisie (3): 2013–14*, 2014–15*, 2015–16
 KNVB Women's Cup (1): 2014–15
*During the BeNe League period (2012 to 2015), the highest placed Dutch team is considered as national champion by the Royal Dutch Football Association.

International
Netherlands U19
 UEFA Women's Under-19 Championship (1): 2014

Netherlands National Team
Algarve Cup: 2018

References

External links
Senior national team profile at Onsoranje.nl (in Dutch)
Under-19 national team profile at Onsoranje.nl (in Dutch)
Under-15 national team profile at Onsoranje.nl (in Dutch)
 Bristol City player profile
 Danique Kerkdijk on Eurosport

1996 births
Living people
People from Olst
Dutch women's footballers
Netherlands women's international footballers
Women's association football defenders
FC Twente (women) players
Bristol City W.F.C. players
Eredivisie (women) players
Women's Super League players
Expatriate women's footballers in England
Dutch expatriate sportspeople in England
2019 FIFA Women's World Cup players
Brighton & Hove Albion W.F.C. players
Dutch expatriate women's footballers
Footballers from Overijssel